WKST (1200 kHz) is a commercial AM radio station in New Castle, Pennsylvania, serving Lawrence County.  It has a talk radio format and is owned by Seven Mountains Media of State College, Pennsylvania, which also owns 34 other radio stations in Pennsylvania including WUZZ (AM) in New Castle and WYLE (FM) in Grove City.

WKST is powered by day at 5,000 watts, using a non-directional antenna.  But because AM 1200 is a clear channel frequency reserved for Class A WOAI San Antonio, WKST must reduce its power at night to 1,000 watts and use a directional antenna.  The transmitter is off Gilmore Road near Interstate 376 in North Beaver Township.

Programming
The station currently has one local weekday talk show, the morning drive time program hosted by veteran broadcaster Ken Hlebovy.  Local news coverage is provided by Wade Sutton.  The rest of the weekday schedule is made up of nationally syndicated shows, including Glenn Beck, Dave Ramsey, Sean Hannity, Mark Levin, Jim Bohannon, "Coast to Coast AM with George Noory" and "America in the Morning with John Trout."

Weekends feature shows on money, health, gardening, home repair and technology, as well as Saturday and Sunday morning polka music programs with Val Palowski.  Weekend syndicated talk hosts include "The Tech Guy with Leo Laporte," "The Weekend with Joe Pags," "At Home with Gary Sullivan," "In The Garden with Ron Wilson" and "Somewhere in Time with Art Bell" as well as repeats of weekday shows.  World and national news is provided by Fox News Radio.

WKST carries New Castle High School basketball and football broadcasts as well as Cleveland Browns football.

History
In the 1940s it was a Mutual Broadcasting System network affiliate. It carried Mutual's dramas, comedies, news, sports, soap operas, game shows, children's shows and big band broadcasts, during the "Golden Age of Radio."

In 1942, Alan Freed landed his first broadcasting job at WKST, before moving on to nearby WKBN Youngstown, Ohio, followed by WAKR Akron, and then WJW Cleveland — the station where Freed is credited with popularizing the term "rock and roll" to describe the music genre.  By the 1970s WKST was owned by Faye and Herb Scott, formerly based in Pottstown, Pennsylvania, and held in the name of Great Scott Broadcasting.  Great Scott purchased FM station WFEM in Ellwood City, and it became WKST-FM on January 1, 1988.  In the late 1990s, after the death of the Scotts, Great Scott decided to concentrate on its radio holdings in Delaware.  It sold WKST and WKST-FM to Jacor Communications for $2.5 million in December 1998.

Prior to November 5, 1999, the 1200 kHz frequency was occupied by WBZY.  WBZY began broadcasting in 1968.  In December 1986 WBZY was sold by Lawrence County Broadcasting Corp. to a partnership called WBZY Radio Sam (the "Sam" representing the surname initials of partners Samuel M. Shirey, William G. Andrews and Robert L. McCracken).  Andrews sold his share to the other two partners in 1991. WBZY was then sold to Jacor in April 1999 for $800,000.  Jacor was purchased by Clear Channel Communications shortly thereafter.  (Clear Channel later changed its name to iHeartMedia, Inc.)

Clear Channel, which also owned WKST, switched the call signs and formats in November 1999. The calls of WKST-FM were changed to WJST on October 10, 2000, and WKST-FM call sign was moved to Pittsburgh where it could be used with Clear Channel's KISS-FM brand.  In April 2004, Clear Channel announced the sale of WKST along with WBZY and WJST (FM) to Forever Broadcasting for $2.85 million.  On September 20, 2004, the WJST call sign was moved to 1280 AM, and WJST-FM became WKPL (FM).

It was announced on October 12, 2022 that Forever Media is selling 34 stations, including WKST, to State College-based Seven Mountains Media for $17.3 million. The deal closed on January 2, 2023.

References

External links

KST
News and talk radio stations in the United States
Radio stations established in 1938
KST (AM)